Cottonwood Canyon is a canyon in central Kane County, Utah United States.

Description
The canyon is a water-carved canyon that has eroded along weak locations in the Earth's crust at the joins between major geological regions. To the east are the lower steps of the Grand Staircase, which is not visible from the road, and to the north is the Kaiparowits Plateau.

See also

 List of canyons and gorges in Utah
 Cottonwood Canyon Road - a dirt road that passes through varied geological features, including a portion of Cottonwood Canyon

References

External links

Canyons and gorges of Utah
Landforms of Kane County, Utah